The motto of Tunisia is Freedom, Order, Justice (Ḥoṛiya, Niẓam, 'Adāla).

History 
The original motto (Freedom, Order, Justice) was adopted with the new coat of arms of an independent Tunisia by the Decree of the Bey of 21 June 1956. After the proclamation of the Republic on 25 July 1957 it remained the emblem of the republican regime. It is stipulated in Article 4 of the 1959 Constitution.

The law of 30 May 1963, which amended the coat of arms, also changes the written national motto to become (Freedom, Justice, Order). The decree of 2 September 1989 reverses the order of the written national emblem by returning to the 1956 regime. The motto was changed to “Freedom, Dignity, Justice, Order” by virtue of an order pursuant to Article 4 of the 2014 Constitution.

In June 2014, the Ministry of Culture announced the opening of a national debate to select the best artwork embodying the new coat of arms of the Republic of Tunisia, and a prize of 15,000 Tunisian dinars was set for the winning work. In February 2016, the ministry announced that no suitable model had been found and a new committee was formed to oversee this task. As of May 2018, no new design has been introduced.

The motto is again changed to Freedom, Order, Justice by article 9 of the new constitution of 25 July 2022.

References

National symbols of Tunisia
National mottos